Brandon Bailey is an American professional basketball coach who was an assistant coach for the Boston Celtics of the National Basketball Association (NBA).

Coaching career 
Bailey worked for Doug Bruno at DePaul University with their women’s basketball team between 2005 and 2009. Also, during his summers he was working as a player development intern for Tim Grover at Attack Athletics between 2007 and 2009. Afterwards, he was a graduate assistant for Jerry Wainwright and Oliver Purnell at DePaul men's basketball team from 2009–2011.

Boston Celtics 
Bailey began his career with the Boston Celtics in their video department as a video intern in 2011. 

On October 6, 2017, it was announced that Bailey has been named the head coach of the Maine Red Claws, the Celtics G League affiliate. He coached Maine for the 2017–18 and 2018–19 seasons. 

In July 2019, Bailey was hired as an assistant coach under Brad Stevens with the Boston Celtics.

Personal life 
Bailey is from Chicago and played basketball for his father at St. Patrick High School. Bailey graduated from St. Patrick in 2004.

References

Year of birth missing (living people)
Living people
Basketball coaches from Illinois
Boston Celtics assistant coaches
Maine Red Claws coaches
Sportspeople from Chicago